Boston is an American rock band from namesake Boston, Massachusetts, that had its most notable successes during the 1970s and '80s. Boston has released six studio albums, one compilation album, sixteen singles and four music videos. Their self-titled debut album was released in 1976 on Epic Records. Helped by the singles "More Than a Feeling", "Foreplay/Long Time", and "Peace of Mind", the album peaked at number three on the Billboard chart and remained on the chart for 132 weeks. It went platinum 17 times in the United States and was the best-selling debut album in history. "More Than a Feeling" peaked at number five on the Billboard Hot 100.

The band's second album, Don't Look Back, was released in 1978. It peaked at number one on the charts in both the US and Canada, and it went seven times platinum in the US and four times platinum in Canada. Its title track peaked at number four on the Billboard Hot 100.

After an eight-year hiatus due in part to legal problems, Boston's next album, Third Stage, was released by MCA Records in 1986. The album peaked at number one in both the US and in Canada. It went four times platinum in the US and three times platinum in Canada. The single "Amanda" also peaked at number one in both countries.

Walk On, their fourth studio album, was released in 1994. It peaked at number seven in the US and at number 10 in Canada and went platinum in both countries. A compilation album titled Greatest Hits was released in 1997 and went platinum twice.

Boston's fifth studio album, Corporate America, was released in 2002 by Artemis Records. Overall, the band have sold over 31 million albums in the US.

Boston's sixth studio album, Life, Love & Hope was released in December 2013.  A world tour followed in 2014.

Albums

Studio albums

Compilation albums

Singles 

"Higher Power" reached #17 on the Billboard Heritage Rock Chart in 1997.

References

External links
Official discography of Boston

Discography
Discographies of American artists
Rock music group discographies